Thiruchi Loganathan (24 July 1924 – 17 November 1989)  was a playback singer of the Tamil film industry. He is known for his work in movies such as Manthiri Kumari (1950)and Sarvadhikari'. He was married to Rajalakshmi, daughter of actress C. T. Rajakantham. His sons are, T. L. Maharajan, Deepan Chakravarthy, and T.L. Thyagarajan, who are also popular playback singers.

Career

Music composers he sang for

Playback singers he sang with
He sang memorable duets mostly with P. Leela and Jikki. He also sang with many others including, M. L. Vasanthakumari, M. S. Rajeswari, L. R. Eswari, P. A. Periyanayaki, T. V. Rathnam, A. G. Rathnamala, A. P. Komala, N. L. Ganasaraswathi, Radha Jayalakshmi, K. Jamuna Rani, K. Rani, Lakshmi Shankar, P. Susheela, S. Janaki, A. V. Saraswathi, T. S. Bagavathi, Vadivambal, Swarnalatha, K. Swarna and U. R. Chandra.

He also sang duets with male singers, most notably with Seerkazhi Govindarajan and Mariyappa. Other singers that he sang with include S. C. Krishnan, T. M. Soundararajan, G. Ramanathan, A. L. Raghavan, C. R. Subburaman, P. B. Sreenivas, K. R. Chellamuthu, Maadhavan, Shanmugasundharam, V. T. Rajagopalan, G. K. Venkatesh and T. L. Maharajan.

The singing actors he sang with were N. S. Krishnan, U. R. Jeevarathinam and Friend Ramasamy.

Discography

References
   

1924 births
1989 deaths
Indian male playback singers
Malayalam playback singers
Musicians from Tiruchirappalli
Tamil playback singers
20th-century Indian male singers
20th-century Indian singers